Ephysteris subovata is a moth in the family Gelechiidae. It was described by Povolný in 2001. It is found in Transbaikalia and China (Jilin, Gansu, Hebei, Ningxia, Shaanxi, Tianjin).

The length of the forewings is 5–6 mm. The forewings are covered with grey, brown-tipped scales, and mottled by ochreous scales along the veins. There are small dark spots about one-third near the costal margin, a distinct black spot surrounded by ochreous scales in the cell and two black spots at one-third and two-thirds near the dorsal margin. The hindwings are pale grey. Adults are on wing from June to August in China.

References

Ephysteris
Moths described in 2001